Fehérvár Football Club, previously called Videoton FC, is a professional Hungarian football club based in Székesfehérvár, Hungary.

Matches
Fehérvár score listed first.

UEFA-organised seasonal competitions

Champions League

UEFA Cup and Europa League

UEFA Europa Conference League

UEFA Intertoto Cup

Overall record
As of 28 August 2018

Legend: GF = Goals For. GA = Goals Against. GD = Goal Difference.

Record by country of opposition
Correct as of 14 August 2018

 P – Played; W – Won; D – Drawn; L – Lost

Club record in UEFA competitions
As correct of 14 August 2018. 

Biggest win: 28/11/1984, Videoton 5–0  FK Partizan, Székesfehérvár
Biggest defeat: 24/11/1976,  1. FC Magdeburg 5–0 Videoton, Magdeburg
Appearances in UEFA Champions League:  3
Appearances in UEFA Europa League:  10
Appearances in UEFA Intertoto Cup:  1
Player with most UEFA appearances: 35 / Vinícius
Top scorers in UEFA club competitions: 10  Szabó

UEFA club ranking

Last updated: 2 October 2020 
Season 2020-21 in progress 
Source: Club coefficients at

References

External links

Fehérvár FC
Hungarian football clubs in international competitions